Eetu Vertainen (born 11 May 1999) is a Finnish professional footballer who plays as a striker for NIFL Premiership side Linfield on loan from Scottish club St Johnstone.

Career
Vertainen began his youth career with KyIF, and joined HJK youth ranks at the age of 11. He started his senior career with Klubi 04 and played for HJK and Ilves.

He signed for Scottish club St Johnstone on 1 September 2021. He moved on loan to Linfield in February 2022. He scored 4 goals in a match on 19 March 2022.

He returned on loan to Linfield in June 2022. After a run of goals, he won league player and goal of he month awards for December 2022, and in January 2023 he scored hat-tricks in successive Saturday matches. Vertainen later said he would consider signing for Linfield on a permanent deal, although he was also linked with a transfer to Welsh club The New Saints.

References

1999 births
Living people
Finnish footballers
Kyrkslätt Idrottsförening players
Klubi 04 players
Helsingin Jalkapalloklubi players
FC Ilves players
St Johnstone F.C. players
Linfield F.C. players
Ykkönen players
Kakkonen players
Veikkausliiga players
Scottish Professional Football League players
Association football forwards
Finnish expatriate footballers
Finnish expatriates in Scotland
Expatriate footballers in Scotland
Finnish expatriates in Northern Ireland
Expatriate association footballers in Northern Ireland
Finland youth international footballers
Finland under-21 international footballers
NIFL Premiership players